Anthony Trevor Alleyne (born 27 June 1993) is a Barbadian cricketer who has represented both the Barbadian national team and the Combined Campuses and Colleges in West Indian domestic cricket. He is left-handed opening batsman.

Alleyne represented the West Indies under-19s at the 2012 Under-19 World Cup in Australia, scoring 52 against India in the opening match of the tournament. The previous year, playing against Australia in an under-19 Test match, he had scored a century, 106 from 136 balls. Alleyne made his first-class debut during the 2012–13 Regional Four Day Competition, playing for the Combined Campuses against the Windward Islands. Opening the batting with Shacaya Thomas in the first innings of the match, he scored 84 from 157 balls. In the 2012–13 Regional Super50, played later in the year, Alleyne scored 158 runs in three matches, including 58 on debut against Guyana and 99 in the semi-final against Trinidad and Tobago.

In November 2016, Alleyne made his first-class debut for Barbados, scoring 19 and 84 in a match against the Leeward Islands in the 2016–17 Regional Four Day Competition. In the next game, against Trinidad and Tobago, he scored 88 from 201 balls in the first innings and 186 from 215 balls in the second, with the latter being his maiden first-class century.

References

External links

1993 births
Living people
Barbadian cricketers
Barbados cricketers
Combined Campuses and Colleges cricketers